The Roman Catholic Diocese of Shunqing/Shunking/Nanchong is a suffragan Latin diocese in the Ecclesiastical province of Chongqing in southwest China, yet depends on the missionary Roman Congregation for the Evangelization of Peoples.

Its cathedral episcopal see is the Cathedral of the Sacred Heart of Jesus, in the Shunqing city center district of Nanchong 南充, Sichuan province. No statistics available.

History 

 Established on 2 August 1929 as Apostolic Vicariate of Shunqingfu 順慶府 / Shunkingfu / de Shunkingfu (Latin) / Choen-kin-fou (French) -fu meaning administrative prefecture], on territory split off from the then Apostolic Vicariate of Chengdu (Tchen-tou-fou; 成都; now a diocese)
 Promoted on April 11, 1946 and renamed after its see as Diocese of Shunqing 順慶 / Nanchong 南充 (Chinese) / Shunking / Sciœnchimen(sis) (Latin).

Episcopal ordinaries
(all Roman Rite native Chinese)

Apostolic Vicar of Shunqingfu 順慶府 
 Paul Wang Wen-cheng (王文成) (December 2, 1929 – April 11, 1946 see below)

Suffragan Bishops of Shunqing 順慶 
 Paul Wang Wen-cheng (王文成) (see above April 11, 1946 – January 28, 1961)
uncanonical: Fan Dao-jiang (范導江) (1963 – death 1987.12.17), without papal mandateuncanonical: Michael Huang Wo-ze (黃渥澤) (1989 – retired 2001), without papal mandate; died 2004
 Joseph Chen Gong-ao (陳功鰲) (2012 – ...)

See also 
 Anglican Diocese of Szechwan
 Catholic Church in Sichuan
 List of Catholic dioceses in China

References

Sources and external links 
 GCatholic.org, with Google map - data for all sections
 Catholic Hierarchy

Shunqing
Religious organizations established in 1929
Roman Catholic dioceses and prelatures established in the 20th century